A list of adventure films released in the 1930s.

1930

1931

1932

1933

1934

1935

1936

1937

1938

1939

References

1930s adventure films
1930s
Adventure